Cyprus–India relations are the bilateral relations between the Cyprus and India. India maintains a High Commission in Nicosia. Cyprus maintains a High Commission in New Delhi.

History 

India supported Cyprus during its struggle for independence from British colonial rule. Diplomatic relations between Cyprus and India were established on 10 February 1962, two years after the former gained independence.

The Indian military has participated in United Nations peacekeeping operations in Cyprus on numerous occasions. Three Indian Generals have served as Commanders of the United Nations Peacekeeping Force in Cyprus (UNFICYP), since its creation in 1964. A road in Larnaca is named after Maj. General Kodandera Subayya Thimayya who died in 1965, while serving as the UNFICYP Force Commander. In 1966, the Government of Cyprus issued a stamp commemorating Thimayya.

Cyprus supports the India–United States Civil Nuclear Agreement, and also supports India within the Nuclear Suppliers Group (NSG) and the International Atomic Energy Agency (IAEA).

Prime Minister Atal Bihari Vajpayee visited Cyprus in October 2002. During the visit, Cyprus declared its support for India's candidature as a permanent member on the UN Security Council. President Pratibha Patil visited the country in October 2009. President Tassos Papadopoulos visited India in April 2006.

Former First of Lady of Cyprus, Lila Erulkar, the wife of President Glafcos Clerides, was born in Ahmedabad and was of Indian Jewish descent. Her father, Dr Abraham Erulkar, was Mahatma Gandhi's personal physician in London in September 1946.[1] The street in Nicosia on which the High Commission of India is located is named after Indira Gandhi. In India, an avenue in New Delhi is named after Archbishop Makarios III.

Economic relations 
Bilateral trade between Cyprus and India totaled EUR 76.5 million in 2015. Cyprus imported 64.5 million and exported 11.1 million worth goods to India. Both countries traded steel and iron with each other.

Between April 2000 and September 2015, Cyprus invested a cumulative total of $8.328 billion making it the eighth largest FDI investor in India. Most of the investments are in the construction and real estate industries.

The Double Taxation Avoidance Agreement between Cyprus and India was revised in 2016.

Indians in Cyprus 
As of July 2015, around 2700 Indian citizens reside in Cyprus. More than of half of them are employed as cosmetics industry, while the other common professions are computer engineers, software programmers and the shipping industry. Approximately 900 Indian students were enrolled at private colleges in Cyprus in 2010–11, but this number reduced to less than 100 by 2015, as Indian students were unable to find part-time jobs owing to the financial crisis in Cyprus.

Recent developments
Prime Minister of India Narendra Modi met the President of Cyprus Nicos Anastasiades in New York. There India and Cyprus agreed to enhance the trade as well as people to people relations, for the benefit of the citizens of both the countries.
India has reassured its support to Cyprus with respect to its territorial integrity.

See also 
 Foreign relations of Cyprus 
 Foreign relations of India

References

External links
High Commission of Cyprus in New Delhi
High Commission of India in Nicosia
Text of Cultural Co-operation Agreement

 

India
Bilateral relations of India